Peter Ljung may refer to:

 Peter Ljung (bowler), Swedish bowler
 Peter Ljung (speedway rider) (born 1982), Swedish motorcycle speedway rider